Oh Seung-ah (born September 13, 1988), is a South Korean singer and actress. She was a member of girl group Rainbow. She gained recognition for playing the role of Yoon Jae-kyeong on The Second Husband as the main villain of the series. She returned to small screen again as Kang Ba-da, the ruthless chaebol of Le Blanc and the lead villain of Vengeance of the Bride.

Early life 
She was born on September 13, 1988, in Seoul, South Korea. She was given the choice to debut with Kara or Rainbow, but she chose Rainbow because she was friends with some of the members before debuting.

Career

2011–2016: Career with Rainbow 

After becoming a member, she also focused on acting and she was made Ambassador of Seoul Character Licensing Fair in July 2011. She was a member of Rainbow until its disbandment in 2016.

2017–present: Acting career 
She then started acting and starred in A Sea of Her Own, for which she was nominated for Excellence Award, Actress in a Daily Drama in 2017. She also starred in Grand Prince as a supporting role, for which she was praised by fans. In 2018 she played a protagonist villain role in Secrets and Lies for which she won the Best Actress award. In 2019 she was the Ambassador of Happy Angel. She was praised for her acting by playing a villainess role in Bad Love.

Personal life 
She has attended Changduk Girls' High School and Sangmyung University.

Discography

Filmography

Film

Television series

Television shows

Ambassadorship 
 Ambassador of Seoul Character Licensing Fair in July, 2011
 Ambassador of Happy Angel in 2019
 Public Relations Ambassador for 'The Miracle of 119 Won (2021)

Awards and nominations

References

External links 

 
 

Living people
Actors from Seoul
Singers from Seoul
21st-century South Korean actresses
South Korean female models
South Korean television actresses
South Korean film actresses
1988 births
DSP Media artists
People from Seoul
South Korean women singers
South_Korean_female_idols